Stipo Marković (born 3 December 1993) is a Bosnian professional footballer who plays as a left-back for Slovenian PrvaLiga club Radomlje.

Honours
Široki Brijeg
Bosnian Cup: 2012–13, 2016–17

References

External links
 

1993 births
Living people
People from Kiseljak
Croats of Bosnia and Herzegovina
Association football fullbacks
Bosnia and Herzegovina footballers
Bosnia and Herzegovina under-21 international footballers
NK Široki Brijeg players
NK Lokomotiva Zagreb players
NK Rudeš players
NK Radomlje players
Premier League of Bosnia and Herzegovina players
Croatian Football League players
First Football League (Croatia) players
Slovenian PrvaLiga players
Bosnia and Herzegovina expatriate footballers
Expatriate footballers in Croatia
Bosnia and Herzegovina expatriate sportspeople in Croatia
Expatriate footballers in Slovenia
Bosnia and Herzegovina expatriate sportspeople in Slovenia